The Volkmarsberg is a mountain in the Swabian Alb, south of Aalen in the Ostalbkreis, Germany, with an altitude of . It rises at the edge of the town of Oberkochen, from where there is a  path to the summit.

On the summit plateau there is a shelter as well as the  Volkmarsberg tower, a stone observation tower built in 1930, from which one has a far-reaching view over the entire Ostalbkreis. In rare temperature inversion conditions the  distant Zugspitze can be seen.

Volkmarsberg was designated as a nature reserve in 1938, and recognised by the European Environment Agency as a nature conservation site in 1994.

References

Mountains and hills of the Swabian Jura